Bocayna Express is a catamaran fast ferry operated by the Spanish-Norwegian shipping company Fred. Olsen Express between the Canary Islands of Fuerteventura and Lanzarote in the Atlantic Ocean. It was delivered to Fred. Olsen in September 2003 and has been operating the route between the towns of Corralejo (Fuerteventura) and Playa Blanca (Lanzarote) since then. The ship is named after the Bocayna strait which separates the two islands it serves.

Design and construction
The Bocayna Express was built in Henderson, Western Australia by Austal.

The diesel engines drive four waterjet propellers: two Rolls-Royce Kamewa 90 SII and two Rolls-Royce Kamewa 80 SII. The electrical energy is generated by two MAN D2866LXE generator units.

The ship can transport up to 436 passengers.

Predecessors
Fred. Olsen has been operating the same route between the ports of Playa Blanca and Corralejo since July 1989. The Bocayna Express replaced the Buganvilla in 2003 and has been serving the route since then.

See also
Ships covering the same route
Volcán de Tindaya

References

External links 

 Bocayna Express information from Austal

Ferries of Spain
2003 ships
Lanzarote
Fuerteventura
Individual catamarans
Transport in the Canary Islands
Ships built by Austal